Sir Henry Farnham Burke,  (1859–1930) was a long-serving Anglo-Irish officer of arms at the College of Arms in London.

Biography
A son of Sir Bernard Burke (who was Ulster King of Arms from 1853 until his death in 1892), Henry Burke was appointed Rouge Croix Pursuivant of Arms in Ordinary in 1880.  In 1887, Burke was promoted to the office of Somerset Herald of Arms in Ordinary.  On 26 October 1911, Burke was promoted to Norroy King of Arms to replace Sir William Henry Weldon.  In that post he was responsible for the design of the Military Cross. In 1913 he was given the additional appointment of Genealogist of the Order of the Bath.  On 22 January 1919, he was promoted to the office of Garter Principal King of Arms on the death of Sir Alfred Scott-Gatty.  He held this office until his own death in 1930.

Burke was invested as a Commander of the Royal Victorian Order (CVO) by King Edward VII at Buckingham Palace on 11 August 1902, and was later promoted to become Knight Commander (KCVO) of the Order. He was awarded CB in the 1911 Coronation Honours.

Arms

Heraldic succession

See also
Heraldry
Pursuivant
Herald
King of Arms

References

External links
CUHAGS Officer of Arms Index

1859 births
1930 deaths
House of Burgh
English officers of arms
Fellows of the Society of Antiquaries of London
Companions of the Order of the Bath
Knights Commander of the Royal Victorian Order
Garter Principal Kings of Arms